The 1994 Georgia lieutenant gubernatorial election was held on November 8, 1994, to elect the lieutenant governor of Georgia, concurrently with the 1994 gubernatorial election, as well as elections to the United States House of Representatives and various state and local elections. Georgia is one of 21 states that elects its lieutenant governor separately from its governor.

Incumbent Democratic lieutenant governor Pierre Howard won re-election to a second term, defeating Republican nominee Nancy Schaefer.

Democratic primary

Candidates
Pierre Howard, incumbent Lieutenant Governor of Georgia
 Howard Rabb

Results

General election

Results

See also
1994 United States gubernatorial elections
1994 Georgia gubernatorial election
1994 United States House of Representatives elections in Georgia
State of Georgia
Lieutenant Governors of Georgia

References

1994 Georgia (U.S. state) elections
Lieutenant Governors of Georgia (U.S. state)